The women's 15 km individual competition of the 2015 Winter Universiade was held at the National Biathlon Centre in Osrblie on January 25.

Results

References 

Women's 15km
2015 in Slovak women's sport